Jordanita paupera is a moth of the family Zygaenidae. It is known from Turkey, Transcaucasia, Jordan, northern Iran, Turkmenistan, Uzbekistan and Kazakhstan. In the east, it ranges up to the Amur and Korea.

The length of the forewings is 12–12.8 mm for males and 9–10.5 mm for females. Adults are on wing from June to July.

The larvae feed on Artemisia species.

References

C. M. Naumann, W. G. Tremewan: The Western Palaearctic Zygaenidae. Apollo Books, Stenstrup 1999,

External links
Lepiforum e. V.
Barcode of Life Data Systems (BOLD)

Procridinae
Moths described in 1887